was a Japanese author.

Biography
Kaga was born in Tokyo, and studied psychiatry and criminology at the University of Tokyo Medical School. He worked in a hospital and then prison before going to France in 1957 for further studies. After returning to Japan in 1960, Kaga took up university teaching, and was a psychology professor at the Tokyo Medical and Dental University (1965-1969) and Sophia University (1969 - 1979).

Kaga wrote several novels based on his time in France, including Arechi o tabi suru monotachi (Travelers through the Wasteland) and Furandoru no fuyu (Winter in Flanders) which won the Minister of Education Award for New Artists in 1968. His 1973 novel Kaerazaru natsu (帰らざる夏, A Summer Long Gone), on the tragic consequences of a young man's military indoctrination during World War II received the Tanizaki Prize. His 1982 historical fiction about World War II, Ikari no nai fune (Riding the East Wind), has been translated to English to good reviews.

Kaga a full-time writer from 1979. In 1987 he converted to Catholicism at the age of 58 through the influence of Shusaku Endo.

Kaga died on January 12, 2023, at the age of 93.

Major awards
 1968 Minister of Education Award for New Artists for Furandoru no fuyu (Winter in Flanders)
 1974 Tanizaki Prize for Kaerazaru natsu (帰らざる夏, A Summer Long Gone)
 1979 Japan Literature Grand Prize for Senkoku (The Verdict)
 1985 Osaragi Jiro Prize for Shitsugen (The Marsh)
 2011 Person of Cultural Merit

Selected works in translation
 Riding the East Wind: A Novel of War and Peace (Ikari no nai fune), trans. Ian Hideo Levy, Kodansha America, 2002. .
 Marshland (Shitsugen), trans. Albert Novick, Dalkey Archive, 2022. .

References

External links
 Otohiko Kaga at J'Lit Books from Japan 
 Synopsis of Takayama Ukon at JLPP (Japanese Literature Publishing Project)

1929 births
2023 deaths
People from Tokyo
University of Tokyo alumni
20th-century Japanese novelists
21st-century Japanese novelists
People associated with the Department of Neuropsychiatry University of Tokyo
Members of the Japan Art Academy
Persons of Cultural Merit
Recipients of the Order of the Rising Sun
Japanese psychiatrists
Japanese Roman Catholics
Converts to Roman Catholicism
Academic staff of Sophia University
Academic staff of Tokyo Medical and Dental University
Fulbright alumni